The 1962 Individual Speedway World Championship was the 17th edition of the official World Championship to determine the world champion rider.

The final was sponsored by the Sunday Pictorial and England's Peter Craven won his second title finishing one point ahead of two time champion Barry Briggs. Three time champion Ove Fundin defeated fellow Swede Björn Knutsson in a ride off to claim the bronze medal.

First round
British & Commonwealth Qualifying - 48 riders to British & Commonwealth first round
Scandinavian Qualifying - 16 to Nordic Final
Continental Qualifying - 16 to Continental Final

British & Commonwealth Qualifying

Scandinavian Qualifying

Continental Qualifying

Second round
British & Commonwealth first round - 16 to British & Commonwealth finals
Scandinavian Final - 8 to European Final
Continental Final - 8 to European Final

British & Commonwealth First Round

Nordic Final
July 3, 1962
 Hillerød
 First 8 to European Final

Continental Final
 June 17, 1962
 Wroclaw
 First 8 to European Final

Third round
British & Commonwealth Finals - 8 to World Final
European Final - 8 to World Final

British & Commonwealth Finals
Three events with the top 8 accumulated scorers going through

Top 8 qualifying for World Final
  Peter Craven 41 pts (beat Briggs in ride off to become 1926 British champion)
  Barry Briggs 41 pts
  Ronnie Moore 38 pts
  Ken McKinlay 33 pts
  Ron How 30 pts
  Ron Mountford 29 pts
  Bob Andrews 29 pts
  Mike Broadbanks 26 pts
res -  Nigel Boocock 22 pts

European Final
June 26, 1962
 Oslo
 First 8 to World Final plus 1 reserve

World Final
8 September 1962
 London, Wembley Stadium
Referee: C. H. King

References

1962
Individual Speedway
Individual Speedway World Championship
Individual Speedway World Championship
Speedway competitions in the United Kingdom